Nerd Wars! is a 2011 American short film written, directed and edited by Willie Peña and starring Michael M. Peña, Nathaniel A. Peña, Alfonso Freeman, and Lia Marie Johnson. The comedy tells the story of the rivalry between class nerd Alfonso, played by Michael M. Peña, and Marty Baboor, a newly arrived "super-nerd" student from India played by Nathaniel A. Peña.
This short film, which was shot in High Definition Video, was produced under a SAG New Media Contract with a budget of less than 10,000 dollars. It has an anti-bullying theme.

Plot
Alfonso is the resident sixth-grade nerd who is quite happy with his status as an intellectual genius. His day is ruined, however, when a new kid arrives to class…Marty, the super-nerd from India. Marty takes no prisoners, and Alfonso quickly finds himself outmatched by the new kid. The rivalry continues in gym class with a brutal game of dodge ball and finally ends up in an epic after-school battle. Romantic interest is provided by the militant Russian nerd Ivanka, played by Danika Yarosh, and Doris, played by Lia Marie Johnson, who firmly believes she is a witch with magic powers.

Cast
 Michael Manuel Peña as Alfonso
 Nathaniel A. Pena as Marty Baboor
 Alfonso Freeman as Mr. Chen
 Lia Marie Johnson as Doris
 Everhet Kokason as Boris
 Danika Yarosh as Ivanka
 Milton Greenberg as Angel
 Jemal Draco as Raheem
 Kent A. Gallegos as Coach
 Deborah Vieths as Cafeteria Lady
 Allie Costa as Natalie Grace
 Jessica Gwennap as Sally
 Marisa Imbroane as Suzie
 Chad Pawlak as Ryan
 Ryan Snyder as Chad
 Devin Knight as Janitor
 Keira Peña as Lily
 Sancho Martin as B-Boy Alfonso
 Jason Sensation Thomas as B-Boy Marty
 Willie Peña as Dad (cameo)

Production
Willie Peña wrote the film after watching his two sons, who play the leads, pretend to be nerds engaged in a fistfight while on a photo shoot. Principal photography took place on four Saturdays in May, 2011. Editing took approximately five months, as everything from sound to visual effects was handled by the first-time director who had no prior experience and had to teach himself the software and art of video editing.

Screenings and reception
Nerd Wars! was accepted as part of the WorldkidsFoundation 'Lessons in the Dark' film screenings for schoolchildren in Delhi and Mumbai, India and will be part of the organization's monthly showings at the National Center for the Performing Arts in Mumbai in 2012.

References

External links
 
 Have Your Cupcake and Eat It Too
 FilmDIY

2011 films
American short films
2010s English-language films